Ruwani Abeymanne (born 19 August 1970) is a former Sri Lankan female shooter. She represented Sri Lanka at the 2000 Summer Olympics. She competed at the Women's 10 metre air pistol and in the Women's 25 metre air pistol events in the 2000 Summer Olympics.

References

External links
 

1970 births
Living people
Shooters at the 2000 Summer Olympics
Sri Lankan female sport shooters
Olympic shooters of Sri Lanka